Indians in Korea consist of migrants diaspora from India to Korea and their locally born descendants. A majority of them live in Seoul while there are smaller populations living in other parts of Korea.

History of Indian migration

Heo Hwang-ok: the Indian Princess & Queen of Korea 

According to the 11th century legendary chronicle Samguk Yusa, Heo Hwang-ok, the consort of Suro of Geumgwan Gaya was originally a princess from a kingdom called Ayuta. In the 20th century, Kim Byung-Mo, an anthropologist from the Hanyang University, identified Ayuta with Ayodhya in India based on phonetic similarity. Heo Hwang-ok is considered an ancestor by several Korean lineages, which has led to Korean interest in Ayodhya, resulting in the construction of a Memorial of Heo Hwang-ok there.

In 673 CE, Chinese Buddhist pilgrim, Yijing who reached India, recorded that the people of Indian subcontinent were familiar with Korea's customs and beliefs and they regarded Koreans as "worshipers of the rooster". This concept about Koreans was grounded in a legend of the Silla dynasty.

Malananta: the 4th century Indian Buddhist monk in Korea 

The two oldest extant histories of Korea Samguk yusa and Samguk sagi record the following 3 monks among first to bring the Buddhist teaching, or Dharma, to Korea in the 4th century during the Three Kingdoms period. These mention the following monks: Malananta (मेघानंदा, Meghananda, Melananda or cloud monk)- an Indian Buddhist monk who came via Serindian area of southern China's Eastern Jin Dynasty. He was received by the King Chimnyu of Baekje in the southern Korea in 384 CE. King adopted Buddhism and Buddhism became the state religion. Other two monks who introduced Buddhism to the remaining 2 parts of the Three Kingdoms were Sundo - a monk from the northern Chinese state Former Qin who brought Buddhism to Goguryeo in northern Korea in 372 CE and Ado monk who brought Buddhism to Silla in central Korea.

Korean War

While the Indian army did not get involved militarily in the Korean War, they sent a medical unit, the 60 Parachute Field Ambulance, which served in Korea for a total of three and a half years (Nov 1950- May 1954), the longest single tenure by any military unit under the UN flag.

They were involved in providing medical cover alternately to the US Army/ROK forces and the Commonwealth Division under the UN Command as well as the local civilians, and earned the informal title, "The Maroon Angels". The unit also looked after the North Korean POWs. The unit provided an ADS and a surgical team (7 officers and 5 other ranks) during Operation Tomahawk, an airborne operation launched on 21 March 1951 by the US Army’s 187 Airborne Regimental Combat Team.

Towards the end of the Korean War in 1953, a reinforced brigade known as the Custodian Force of India was deployed for the repatriation of the prisoners of war and was deployed for almost two years (1953–54).

After the Division of Korea

South Korea has been gaining popularity among Indian expatriates. Since the 1970s, many Indians have been coming to the South Korea and now there are about 7,006 Indians as per International Migration Report, living and working in the country.

According to officials of the Indian mission in South Korea, over 1,000 engineers and software professionals have recently come to South Korea, working for large conglomerates such as LG, Hyundai and Samsung,  which have today become household names back in India. There are also around 125 Indian scientists and post-doctoral research scholars working or conducting research at various institutions in the country. Indian companies are also making inroads in South Korea. The agreement between Indian and South Korea on IT will leverage the IT software capabilities of India and IT hardware capabilities of South Korea, resulting in an increased flow of IT professionals between the two countries.

Skilled IT Professionals and Researchers

Recently there has been influx of many skilled IT professionals and researchers due to investment in emerging technologies by major companies. South Korean companies are now keen to employ Indian engineers and are offering them salaries that are above par even by western standards. The companies are also extending support for free housing and food.

Notable people
Anupam Tripathi, actor in Squid Game
Shammi Rana,  Rapporteur in UNESCO

Organizations and associations

With close to ten thousands Indian population, Several organisations in South Korea support Indian community. Some notable communities which are active includes
1. Indian Students and Researchers in South Korea (ISRK) - represents close to 4000 researchers, Post Docs and students in Korea. They do various activities to support students communities.
2. Indians in Korea - Busan based organisation is known for organising Busan Holi festival every years.
3. IndiansInKorea" (also known as IIK) with more than 5000 members (www.indiansinkorea.com)
4. Indian Association of Korea with mainly professionals as members
5. Annapurna Indian Women's Association

See also
 Buddhism in Korea
 Hinduism in China
 Hinduism in Japan
 Hinduism in Korea
 Koreans in India
 Memorial of Heo Hwang-ok, Ayodhya 
 India–South Korea relations
 India – North Korea relations
 List of Hindu temples outside India

References

External links
Indians in Korea
Indians in Korea Forum

Korea
 
Demographics of South Korea
Indians